Murder of pregnant women is a type of homicide, often resulting from domestic violence. Domestic violence—or intimate partner violence (IPV)—is suffered by many, and when analyzing cases in which victims came forward, men are more likely than women to commit acts of severe domestic battery, and women are more likely to suffer serious injury as a result. Many of these women fear harm not just to themselves but also to their unborn children. Recently, more focus has been placed on pregnancy-associated deaths due to violence. IPV may begin when the victim becomes pregnant.  Research has shown that abuse while pregnant is a red flag for pregnancy-associated homicide.

The murder of pregnant women represents a relatively recently studied class of murder. Limited statistics are available as there is no reliable system in place yet to track such cases. Whether pregnancy is a causal factor is hard to determine.

Statistics
ABC News have reported that studies in Maryland, New York, and Chicago found that approximately 20 percent of women who die during pregnancy are victims of murder. In 2004, The Washington Post examined death-record data across the US which documented the killings of 1,367 pregnant women and new mothers since 1990. The newspaper reports:

[T]he killings span racial and ethnic groups. In cases whose details were known, 67 percent of women were killed with firearms. Many women were slain at home — in bedrooms, living rooms, kitchens — usually by men they knew. Husbands. Boyfriends. Lovers.Isabelle Horon and Diana Cheng of the Maryland Department of Health and Mental Hygiene conducted a study of pregnancy-associated deaths in Maryland between 1993 and 1998, defining pregnancy-associated death as death during pregnancy or within a year of pregnancy ending. They found that homicide was the leading cause of pregnancy-associated death, accounting for 20% of such deaths. In contrast, homicide was only the fifth leading cause of death for women of reproductive age who had not been pregnant in the year previous to their death, and accounted for 6.4% of deaths in this group. The second leading cause of pregnancy-associated death, heart disease, accounted for 19%. A study using data from the District of Columbia also found that homicide was the leading cause of pregnancy-associated death.

A CDC study reported that "the overall pregnancy-associated homicide ratio was 1.7 deaths per 100,000 live births", and that homicide was not the leading cause of pregnancy-associated death, though it was still highlighted as among the leading causes. However, Horon and Cheng argued that the CDC's study underestimated the problem because it used incomplete information. Using more sources of information, Horon and Cheng found that the rate of pregnancy-associated homicide in Maryland was 10.5 per 100,000 live births. They suggested a need for US states to improve their collection of data on pregnancy-associated deaths. The Washington Post reported in 2004 that "13 states said they had no way of telling how many pregnant and postpartum women had been killed in recent years". In 2003, California remedied this by changing its death certificate documentation to include a female victim's maternity status.

Homicide was the second-leading cause of death among women ages 20 to 24 and fifth among women ages 25–34 in 1999. The top cause of death in both age groups is accidents. Research from a study on pregnancy-associated deaths from violence in Virginia showed that homicide was a leading cause of death, accounting for 13% of all deaths in the sample. That same study showed that violence (suicide, homicide, and accidental overdoses) comprised 30% of all deaths in the sample. Racial disparities were evident in the data, Black women were 4.5 times more likely to die from pregnancy-associated homicide than white women.

Laws and policies
The Unborn Victims of Violence Act, passed in 2004, defines a fetus as a "child in uterus" and a person as being a legal crime victim "if a fetal injury or death occurs during the commission of a federal violent crime." In the U.S., 38 states have laws with more harsh penalties if the victim is murdered while pregnant. Some of these laws defining the fetus as being a person, "for the purpose of criminal prosecution of the offender" (National Conference of State Legislatures, 2008). Laci Peterson, murdered in 2002, is one of the more high-profile homicides.

Currently in the North Carolina Senate, a bill called the SB 353 Unborn Victims of Violence Act is being considered for legislation that would create a separate criminal offense for the death of a fetus when the mother is murdered. The North Carolina Coalition Against Domestic Violence does not support this law for numerous reasons including failure to see violence against the mother as the cause of the fetal death. The Coalition does, however, support the position of the National Network to End Domestic Violence regarding the Unborn Victims of Violence Act.

Intervention
Women may feel safe speaking to their health care providers about the abuse, especially after discovering they are pregnant. Some medical office and hospital policies specify that doctors will examine the patient privately without allowing the partner access. In a 2001 editorial in the Journal of the American Medical Association, Victoria Frye writes, "Homicide by intimate partners may offer a focal point for effective pregnancy-associated mortality prevention efforts because many of these women come into contact with the health care system before their deaths." Reviews of Intimate Partner Homicide policy and research has identified several needs: System-wide training in healthcare on signs of domestic violence and system-wide screening for domestic violence by health care providers, as well as the knowledge of where to refer women to that need services when abuse is disclosed.

References

External links
National Conference of State Legislatures
North Carolina Coalition Against Domestic Violence
National Network to End Domestic Violence

Femicide
Domestic violence
Murder
Pregnancy with abortive outcome